Rathaus  is a station on  of the Vienna U-Bahn. It is located in the Innere Stadt District. It opened in 1980.

Nearby points of interest
Rathaus
Austrian Parliament Building

References

Buildings and structures in Innere Stadt
Railway stations opened in 1980
Vienna U-Bahn stations